From Bessie To Brazil is a 1993 album by jazz vocalist Susannah McCorkle. It peaked at number 20 on the Billboard Top Jazz Albums chart.

Reception

Music critic Scott Yanow of AllMusic praised the album and called it "a fine all-round showcase for the talented singer."

Track listing

Personnel
 Susannah McCorkle - vocals
 Allen Farnham - piano, musical director
 Howard Alden – guitar
 Kiyoshi Kitagawa - bass
 Chuck Redd – drums
 Randy Sandke – trumpet, flugelhorn
 Dick Oatts – alto saxophone, flute
 Ken Peplowski – tenor saxophone, clarinet
 Robert Trowers – trombone

“Thief in The Night” & “The People That You Never Get To Love” arranged by Allen Farnham;
“The Lady Is a Tramp” & “Hit the Road to Dreamland” arranged by Ben Aronov; 
“Ac-Cent-Tchu-Ate the Positive” & “Love” arranged by Richard De Rosa.

References

1993 albums
Susannah McCorkle albums